Sean Palfrey (born 24 July 1968) is a Welsh former professional darts player who played in Professional Darts Corporation (PDC) events.

Career

Palfrey was a regular in the British Darts Organisation (BDO) World Professional Darts Championship, where his best result was reaching the quarter-finals in 1998. He played for the Welsh men's team in the WDF World Cup darts competition in 1997. He made a total of 32 international appearances for Wales.

World Championship results

BDO

 1991: 1st round (lost to Bob Anderson 1–3)
 1994: 1st round (lost to Roland Scholten 0–3)
 1995: 2nd round (lost to Paul Hogan 0–3)
 1997: 1st round (lost to Raymond van Barneveld 0–3)
 1998: Quarter-finals (lost to Roland Scholten 4–5)
 1999: 1st round (lost to Raymond van Barneveld 0–3)
 2000: 1st round (lost to Steve Duke 2–3)

References

External links
Player profile on Darts Database

Welsh darts players
Living people
British Darts Organisation players
Professional Darts Corporation former pro tour players
1968 births